Noble Aspirations, also known as The Legend of Chusen, is a 2016 Chinese xianxia television series based on Xiao Ding's best-seller novel Zhu Xian. Produced by H&R Century Pictures Co.,Ltd, the series stars Li Yifeng, Zhao Liying, Yang Zi, Cheng Yi and Qin Junjie in the leading roles.

The first season aired from 31 July to 8 November 2016 on Hunan TV. The second season premiered on 8 December 2016 on Tencent Video.

Synopsis

Season One
Zhang Xiaofan (Li Yifeng), and childhood friend Lin Jingyu (Cheng Yi), are the sole survivors of a village massacre. The two are accepted into the Qing Yun sect, where they learn the ways of the Immortal Sword. Although he is hardworking and determined, Xiaofan struggles to catch up to his peers due to his slow wit. One day, he acquires a "dementor sword" by chance when he was training in the mountains.

During the martial arts competition held within Qing Yun sect, Xiaofan enters the Top 4. Together with Lu Xueqi (Yang Zi), Lin Jingyu and Zeng Shushu (Qin Junjie), he heads to the Bat Cave in Mt Kongsan to investigate the trails of the demonic sect. There, Xiaofan encounters danger and pivotal circumstances make him grow and mature. Along the journey, he meets Bi Yao (Zhao Liying), daughter of the Ghost King. Their relationship slowly grows and takes a meaningful turn through these difficult times.

However, the villainous Ghost King attempts to overthrow the Qing Yun sect, and Xiaofan puts his life on the line. Bi Yao sacrifices herself to save him, falling into an endless sleep.

Season Two
After Bi Yao sacrifices her life to protect Zhang Xiaofan, she falls into an endless sleep. Devastated and vengeful, Xiaofan decides to devote his life to saving her. He enters the Ghost King's faction, and becomes his right-hand man Gui Li, also known as "Lord of Blood". He embarks on a quest with former allies Lin Jingyu and Lu Xueqi, as well as former enemies such as Qin Wuyan (Mao Zijun) to revive Bi Yao.

Season Three
Gui Li returns to the central plains to destroy the Zhu Xian sword to revive Bi Yao. However, as he tries to destroy the Zhu Xian sword, he was hurt by the sword's aura. Gui Li was saved by his former master, Pu Zhi, who reminds him of his original heart. He attains the fourth heavenly book from the back mountains of Tian Yin Pavilion. As he enters the Shiwan Mountain to kill the Beast God, he meets Lu Xueqi there and has a fierce battle with her. Gui Li realizes that he loves Lu Xueqi, and was only grateful toward Bi Yao. Gui Li intends to head back to Qing Yun sect to marry Lu Xueqi, but realizes that Dao Xuan has already been taken control of by the Zhu Xian sword. In the midst of battle, Lu Xueqi has no choice but to kill Tian Buyi as he was controlled by Dao Xuan. Unable to accept the death of his former master, Gui Li left Qing Yun. The Ghost Lord went into a craze, causing the Huqi Mountains to be destroyed and Bi Yao's body to be lost. Gui Li's ten-year-wish to revive Bi Yao suddenly falls empty, and realizing the importance of true love, he decides to go look for Lu Xueqi. The Ghost Lord finally revives Bi Yao, and passes to her an overwhelming force of cultivation. Facing his former lover and the common people of the world, Gui Li finally understands that evil and kindness are ultimately decided by one's heart. With the help of Lu Xueqi, he rebuilds the Zhu Xian sword, and then spends the rest of his life with Lu Xueqi.

Cast

Main

Supporting

Qing Yun Sect (青云门)

Tian Yin Pavilion (天音阁)

Ghost King Faction (鬼王宗)

Hundred Poison sect (万毒门)

He Huan Sect (合欢派)

Lian Xie Hall (炼血堂)

Fen Xiang Valley (焚香谷)

Yu Du City (渝都城)

Chang Sheng Hall (长生堂)

Eastern Sea's Ding Hai Mountain Villa (东海定海山庄)

Little River Town (Heavenly Fox tribe) (小池镇天狐族）

Others

Production
The Golden Horse Award winner,  serves as the stylist and the Hong Kong Film Award laureate, serves as the art director.  serves as the clothes designer. Stunt director  helped designed the wushu stunts and fighting styles for each character. The production of special effects is handled by South Korean company IOFX.

Casting
On September 24, 2015, singers Roy Wang, Wang Junkai, and Jackson Yi from TFBOYS were cast in the drama. On December 5, actress Yang Zi attended the commencement ceremony, and the producers announced that she was cast as Lu Xueqi, one of the two female leads. On December 19, Wu Yue, Zhao Lixin and Chen Chuang joined the cast during filming.

On January 12, 2016, the television series's official Sina Weibo announced that Li Yifeng had been signed on to star as Zhang Xiaofan, the protagonist of Noble Aspirations. On January 25, it announced that Zhao Liying landed the female lead role of Bi Yao.

Filming
Principal photography started on 5 December 2015 at Hengdian Studios and wrapped up on 29 April 2016. The scenes of the drama were shot in various parts of China, such as Yunnan, Jiangxi, Guangxi, Hunan, Fujian, Zhejiang, and Henan. The total investment of the television series reaches ¥ 60 million, with majority of the budget going to special effects.

The scenes set in Qing Yun Mountain were filmed in Laojun Mountain, in Luanchuan County, Henan province. The monkey groups scenes in the Qing Yun Mountain were filmed in Huangshan, Anhui province. The scenes set in Heyang Castle were filmed in Hengdian World Studios, in Dongyang, Zhejiang province. The Liuboshan scenes were filmed in Erhai Lake, Yunnan.

Soundtrack

"Have You Ever Loved", "If We Never Met" and "Broken Heart Flower" were not included in the album and were released as solo singles.

Reception

Critical response
When the television series premiered on July 31, it received mainly positive reviews for its acting and production quality. The series was praised for its beautiful cinematography, exquisite costumes and music.

Commercial reception
The drama was a commercial success. It achieved a market share of 7.075 for its first two episodes, the highest record held by a Chinese drama for the year 2016. In October 2016, it surpassed 20 billion views, becoming the third drama to do so after The Journey of Flower and The Legend of Mi Yue. In December 2016, it became one of the most viewed drama online with over 25 billion views.

Ratings

 Highest ratings are marked in red, lowest ratings are marked in blue

Awards and nominations

International broadcast
  - 8TV (Malaysia)
Global Broadcasting:

References

External links

Zhu Xian
2016 Chinese television series debuts
2016 Chinese television series endings
Mandarin-language television shows
Television shows based on Chinese novels
Television series by H&R Century Pictures
Xianxia television series